"Superwoman" is a song by R&B singer Karyn White, released as the second single from her self-titled debut album in January 1989. It was her second U.S. top ten hit, peaking at number eight, and her second U.S. R&B number-one hit, holding that position for three weeks. It also earned a gold certification from the Recording Industry Association of America (RIAA).

Track listing
7" vinyl single (UK)
 "Superwoman (Edit)" - 4:30
 "The Way You Love Me (Edit)" - 3:45

12" vinyl single (UK)
 "Superwoman (Long Version)"
 "Superwoman (7" Version)" - 4:30
 "The Way You Love Me (New York Groove Edit)"

Charts

Weekly charts

Year-end charts

Certifications

Gladys Knight version

In 1996, a version by Gladys Knight featuring Dionne Warwick and Patti LaBelle was featured on Knight's Good Woman album and released as a single. It reached No. 19 on the Billboard Hot R&B Singles chart.

Charts

References

1988 songs
1988 singles
1989 singles
1991 singles
Karyn White songs
Gladys Knight songs
Dionne Warwick songs
Patti LaBelle songs
Songs written by Babyface (musician)
Songs written by L.A. Reid
Songs written by Daryl Simmons
Song recordings produced by Babyface (musician)
Song recordings produced by Daryl Simmons
Song recordings produced by L.A. Reid
Contemporary R&B ballads
Warner Records singles
MCA Records singles
Songs with feminist themes
1980s ballads